Evans Etti (born 22 August 2001) is a Ghanaian footballer who currently plays as a forward for Heilongjiang Ice City.

Career statistics

Club

Notes

References

2001 births
Living people
Ghanaian footballers
Association football forwards
China League One players
Heilongjiang Ice City F.C. players
Ghanaian expatriate footballers
Ghanaian expatriate sportspeople in China
Expatriate footballers in China